BIX is a rock band from Lithuania. The band was formed in 1987 in Šiauliai and in a few months became a cult band. After a period of intensive touring throughout Europe and the US they were the most experienced Baltic band, and probably the best known in the West. Recording never was a strong side of BIX since they were a 'live' band.

Their style of music may be described as post-punk with the elements of ska, Latin American music and funk.

Members 

 Saulius 'Samas' Urbonavičius - Vocals, guitar
 Gintautas 'Profesorius' Gascevičius - drums
 Mindaugas 'Špokas' Špokauskas - keyboards
 Skirmantas Gibavičius - bass
 Aurimas Povilaitis - percussion

Discography 

 1991 Akli Kariai (LP)
 1992 La Bomba (LP)
 1993 Doozgle (CD,MC)
 1994 Tikras Garsas (MC)
 1995 7 (CD,MC)
 1996 Žiurkių Miestas (MC; originally recorded in 1982)
 1997 WOR'S (CD,MC)
 2008 XX. I dalis (CD)
 2015 BIX-Ray (CD)
 2017 XXX (7 CD's remastered compilation of the previously released albums in different formats; Reissued albums: 1982 -  Žiurkių Miestas/Rats City, 1991 - Akli Kariai,1992 - La Bomba,1993 - Doozgle, 1995 - 7,1997 - Wor's,2015 - Bix-Ray)
 2021 BIX-Berlin'89 (CD,LP) (The very first live album of the band recorded in 1989 in Berlin and discovered unexpectedly after almost 30 years)

External links 

  Official Site

Musical groups established in 1987
Music in Šiauliai
Lithuanian post-punk music groups
Lithuanian rock music groups
Soviet rock music groups